The Woodlawn and Butternut Street Railway, a horse-drawn street trolley line in Syracuse, New York, was established in 1886. The road commenced at North Salina Street at the junction of James Street and traveled to Butternut street and Manlius Street with final destination, Woodlawn Cemetery.

The company merged with Syracuse Consolidated Street Railway in 1890, after an agreement was made that allowed the new company to lease the lines.

References

Defunct railroads in Syracuse, New York
Defunct New York (state) railroads
Railway companies established in 1886
Railway companies disestablished in 1890